Charaxes subornatus, the ornate green charaxes, is a butterfly in the family Nymphalidae. It is found in Ivory Coast, Ghana, Togo, Nigeria, Cameroon, the Central African Republic, the Republic of the Congo, Gabon, the Democratic Republic of the Congo, Uganda and Kenya. The habitat consists of evergreen forests.

The larvae feed on Albizia - A. brownei, A. gummifera and A. zygia.

Subspecies
Charaxes subornatus subornatus (eastern Nigeria, Cameroon, Gabon, Congo, Central African Republic, northern and western Democratic Republic of the Congo)
Charaxes subornatus couilloudi Plantrou, 1976 (Ivory Coast, Ghana, Togo, western Nigeria)
Charaxes subornatus minor Joicey & Talbot, 1921 (Democratic Republic of the Congo, Uganda, north-western Kenya) is considered by some authorities to be a full species

Similar species
Charaxes subornatus is in the Charaxes eupale species group (clade). The clade members are:

Charaxes subornatus
Charaxes eupale
Charaxes dilutus
Charaxes montis
Charaxes minor 
Charaxes schiltzei 
Charaxes schultzei 
Charaxes virescens
Bouyer et al., 2008 erected the genus Viridixes Bouyer & Vingerhoedt, 2008 to accommodate species belonging to the eupale species group.

Realm
Afrotropical realm

References

Victor Gurney Logan Van Someren, 1974 Revisional notes on African Charaxes (Lepidoptera: Nymphalidae). Part IX. Bulletin of the British Museum of Natural History (Entomology) 29 (8):415-487. 
Bouyer, T., Zakharov, E., Rougerie, R. & Vingerhoedt, E. (2008): Les Charaxes du groupe eupale : description d’un nouveau genre, révision et approche génétique (Lepidoptera, Nymphalidae, Charaxinae) Entomologica Africana Hors Série 3:1-32.

External links
African Charaxes/Charaxes Africains Eric Vingerhoedt images of eupale group
Images of C. subornatus couilloudi Royal Museum for Central Africa (Albertine Rift Project)
Images of C. subornatus subornatus (Albertine Rift Project)
Images of C. minor minor Royal Museum for Central Africa (Albertine Rift Project)
99635 Charaxes subornatus subornatus images at Consortium for the Barcode of Life
Charaxes subornatus couilloudi images at BOLD
Charaxes minor minor images at Consortium for the Barcode of Life
Charaxes minor karinae images at BOLD

Butterflies described in 1916
subornatus
Butterflies of Africa